Colville Air Force Station is a closed United States Air Force General Surveillance Radar station. It was closed in 1961.

History
Colville Air Force Station was one of twenty-eight stations built as part of the second segment of the Air Defense Command permanent radar network. Prompted by the start of the Korean War, on July 11, 1950, the Secretary of the Air Force asked the Secretary of Defense for approval to expedite construction of the permanent network. Receiving the Defense Secretary's approval on July 21, the Air Force directed the Corps of Engineers to proceed with construction.  This site took over coverage once provided by the temporary "Lashup" site L-28, Spokane, Washington, which operated between 1950-1952.

The 760th Aircraft Control and Warning Squadron (AC&W Sq) was activated at the new station on 27 November 1950.  The squadron began operating an AN/TPS-1B medium-range search radar in March 1951 at the then Lashup-Permanent site LP-60, and initially the station functioned as a Ground-Control Intercept (GCI) and warning station.  As a GCI station, the squadron's role was to guide interceptor aircraft toward unidentified intruders picked up on the unit's radar scopes.   In November 1951 an AN/TPS-1C replaced the -B model. This radar was subsequently replaced by an AN/FPS-3 long-range search radar and an AN/FPS-5 height-finder radar at this now Permanent site (P-60) in February 1952.

In 1956 the AN/FPS-5 height-finder radar was retired and replaced by an AN/FPS-6 model. Also in 1956 an AN/GPS-3 search radar was installed. In 1958 the 760th AC&W Sq operated a newly installed AN/FPS-20 radar, and the AN/FPS-3 radar was retired. An AN/FPS-6A height-finder was added also in 1958. In 1960 the AN/FPS-20 was modified to the AN/FPS-20A model. During 1960 Colville AFS joined the Semi Automatic Ground Environment (SAGE) system, initially feeding data to DC-15 at Larson AFB, Washington.  After joining, the squadron was redesignated as the 760th Radar Squadron (SAGE) on 15 July 1960.  The radar squadron provided information 24/7 the SAGE Direction Center where it was analyzed to determine range, direction altitude speed and whether or not aircraft were friendly or hostile.

In addition to the main facility, Colville operated several AN/FPS-14 Gap Filler sites:
 Ione, WA        (P-60A) 
 Northport, WA   (P-60B) 
 Curlew AFS, WA      (P-60C) 
 Okanogan, WA    (P-60D) 
 Mazama, WA      (P-60E) 

In November 1960 this site was closed due to budget constraints.  Today the site remains standing, abandoned and severely deteriorated.

Air Force units and assignments

Units
 Constituted as the 760th Aircraft Control and Warning Squadron on 14 November 1950
 Activated at Colville Air Force Station on 27 November 1950
 Redesignated 760th Radar Squadron (SAGE) on 15 July 1960
 Discontinued and inactivated on 1 June 1961

Assignments
 505th Aircraft Control and Warning Group, 1 January 1951
 162d Aircraft Control and Warning Group (Federalized CA ANG), 25 May 1951
 25th Air Division, 6 February 1952
 4702d Defense Wing, 1 January 1953
 9th Air Division, 8 October 1954
 25th Air Division, 15 August 1958
 4700th Air Defense Wing, 1 September 1958
 Spokane Air Defense Sector, 15 March 1960 - 1 June 1961

See also
 List of USAF Aerospace Defense Command General Surveillance Radar Stations

References

 Cornett, Lloyd H. and Johnson, Mildred W., A Handbook of Aerospace Defense Organization  1946 - 1980,  Office of History, Aerospace Defense Center, Peterson AFB, CO (1980).
 Winkler, David F. & Webster, Julie L., Searching the Skies, The Legacy of the United States Cold War Defense Radar Program,  US Army Construction Engineering Research Laboratories, Champaign, IL (1997).
 Information for Colville AFS, WA

Installations of the United States Air Force in Washington (state)
Semi-Automatic Ground Environment sites
Aerospace Defense Command military installations
1950 establishments in Washington (state)
1961 disestablishments in Washington (state)
Military installations established in 1950
Military installations closed in 1961